Respect Yourself may refer to:

Music 
 "Respect Yourself" is the name of a classic soul song by American R&B/gospel group The Staple Singers
 Respect Yourself (album), Joe Cocker album released in 2002

Organisations 
 Respect Yourself, a UK initiative to give sexual health advice for teens
 Respect Yourself, a Canadian initiative to give sexual health advice for teens
 Respect Yourself, a UK non-profit organisation giving information for teens